The Drama Desk Award for Outstanding Set Design is an annual award presented by Drama Desk in recognition of achievements in the theatre among Broadway, Off Broadway and Off-Off Broadway productions. In the 1998 ceremony the category was separated, to honor both plays and musicals. The category was reinstated in the 2010 ceremony.

Winners and nominees

1960s

1970s

1980s

1990s

2010s

See also
 Laurence Olivier Award for Best Set Design
 Tony Award for Best Scenic Design

References

External links
 Drama Desk official website

Set Design